The 2017 Bill Beaumont County Championship Division 1 was the 117th version of the annual, English rugby union, County Championship organised by the RFU for the top tier English counties.  This was the first season it would be officially known as Bill Beaumont Division 1 having previously been known as the Bill Beaumont Cup.  Each county drew its players from rugby union clubs from the third tier and below of the English rugby union league system (typically National League 1, National League 2 North or National League 2 South).  The counties were divided into two regional sections (each divided into two pools, for a total of four) with the winners of each meeting in the final held at Twickenham Stadium.  Cornwall were the defending champions.

Due to changes to the County Championship format (more detail of this below) four new teams were added to the competition, with East Midlands and Northumberland joining the northern section, while Kent and Devon joined the south.  East Midlands (winners) and Kent (runners up) were promoted after reaching the final of the 2016 County Championship Plate, while Northumberland and Devon were promoted by virtue of their performances in the competition over the past couple of seasons.  It also saw a lucky escape for the likes of Yorkshire, who would have been playing tier 2 rugby this year were it not for the competition restructuring.

By the end of the group stages, Lancashire and Cornwall came top of their respective pools, winning all three of their games with a bonus point in each to qualify for the final in what would be the fourth county championship final between the two sides.  Lancashire possibly had the harder time of it as they edged rivals Yorkshire by just one point with neither side playing each other due to the new format, while Cornwall won all their games.  In the Twickenham final, the first half started with Cornwall dominant in taking an 8-0 lead into the break - although they perhaps should have capitalized more on a Lancashire yellow card towards the end of the half.  The second half was a completely different story, however, as Lancashire played some breath-taking rugby scoring three delightful tries to take the game 19-8, ending Cornwall's hope of a treble of championships, and claiming the 24th county championship title for the Red Rose.

Competition format

The 2017 County Championships saw a new competition structure introduced across all three divisions. In tier 1 there were now twelve teams instead of the eight from 2016, with six counties in the northern group, and six in the southern group.  To complicate matters further, each county only played three games per group instead of five.  This meant that some counties had two home games, while the others had just one. The RFU plans to switch this around the following year so that teams that played one home game in 2017 will get two during the 2018 competition - it is assumed that this is against the three teams in the group they did not play the previous season.

At the end of the group stage the top teams with the best record from each group (north and south) advanced to the final held on 28 May 2017 at Twickenham Stadium.  A further change will see relegation occur every two seasons instead of one, with points accumulated over the two seasons taken into consideration. This system will also apply to promoted teams in tier 2.

Participating Counties and ground locations

Group stage

Division 1 North

Round 1

Round 2

Round 3

Division 1 South

Round 1

Round 2

Round 3

Final

Total season attendances
Does not include final at Twickenham which is a neutral venue and involves teams from all three county divisions on the same day

Individual statistics
 Note if players are tied on tries or points the player with the lowest number of appearances will come first.  Also note that points scorers includes tries as well as conversions, penalties and drop goals.  Appearance figures also include coming on as substitutes (unused substitutes not included).  Statistics will also include final.

Top points scorers

Top try scorers

Competition records

Team
Largest home win — 46 points
61 - 15 Yorkshire at home to Eastern Counties on 20 May 2017
Largest away win — 45 points
56 - 11 Cornwall away to Devon on 13 May 2017
Most points scored — 61 points
61 - 15 Yorkshire at home to Eastern Counties on 20 May 2017
Most tries in a match — 9
Yorkshire at home to Eastern Counties on 20 May 2017
Most conversions in a match — 8
Yorkshire at home to Eastern Counties on 20 May 2017
Most penalties in a match — 3
Yorkshire at home to Cheshire on 6 May 2017
Most drop goals in a match — 0

Player
Most points in a match — 20
 Sam Goatley for Gloucestershire at home to Devon on 6 May 2017
Most tries in a match — 4
 Sam Goatley for Gloucestershire at home to Devon on 6 May 2017
Most conversions in a match — 5 (x3)
 Calum Irvine for Yorkshire at home to Northumberland on 20 May 2017
 James Moffat for Gloucestershire at home to Surrey on 20 May 2017
 Matthew Shepherd for Cornwall at home to Hertfordshire on 20 May 2017
Most penalties in a match — 3
 Calum Irvine for Yorkshire at home to Cheshire on 6 May 2017
Most drop goals in a match — 0

Attendances
Highest — 3,525
Cornwall at home to Hertfordshire on 13 May 2017
Lowest — 150 
Gloucestershire at home to Devon on 6 May 2017
Highest Average Attendance — 3,525
Cornwall
Lowest Average Attendance — 150
Gloucestershire

See also
 English rugby union system
 Rugby union in England

References

External links
 NCA Rugby

2017